John Allen (December 30, 1771 – January 22, 1813) was a United States politician and army officer who was killed in the War of 1812.

Allen was born in Rockbridge County, Virginia, and moved with his father to Kentucky in 1779.  He went to school in Bardstown, Kentucky and studied law in Staunton, Virginia. He then returned to Kentucky to law practice in Shelbyville.  He was elected to the Kentucky Senate in 1807, and served until his death.

Early in the War of 1812, Allen raised the 1st Regiment of Riflemen to serve under General William Henry Harrison. Allen was commissioned its colonel. He was killed in action while leading his men at the Battle of Frenchtown on the River Raisin in southeast Michigan.

Allen County, Kentucky was named for him in 1815. He is also honored by Allen County, Ohio, and Allen County, Indiana.

References
Helen Winemiller Wood.  The Naming of Allen County.  Lima, Ohio:  Longmeier, 1984

American militia officers
1771 births
1813 deaths
People from Shelbyville, Kentucky
People from Rockbridge County, Virginia
American military personnel killed in the War of 1812
People from Kentucky in the War of 1812
Virginia colonial people
Kentucky lawyers
Kentucky state senators
American militiamen in the War of 1812
19th-century American lawyers